German submarine U-477 was a Type VIIC U-boat of Nazi Germany's Kriegsmarine during World War II.

She carried out one patrol. She sank no ships.

She was sunk by a Canadian aircraft, west of Trondheim on 3 June 1944.

Design
German Type VIIC submarines were preceded by the shorter Type VIIB submarines. U-477 had a displacement of  when at the surface and  while submerged. She had two shafts and two  propellers.

U-477 was fitted with five  torpedo tubes (four fitted at the bow and one at the stern), fourteen torpedoes, one  SK C/35 naval gun, (220 rounds), one  Flak M42 and two twin  C/30 anti-aircraft guns. The boat had a complement of between forty-four and sixty.

Service history
The submarine was laid down on 17 October 1942 at the Deutsche Werke in Kiel as yard number 308, launched on 3 July 1943 and commissioned on 18 August under the command of Oberleutnant zur See Karl-Joachim Jenssen.

She served with the 5th U-boat Flotilla from 18 August 1943 for training and the 3rd flotilla from 1 June 1944 for operations.

Patrol and loss
U-477s only patrol was preceded by a short trip from Kiel in Germany to Kristiansand in Norway. The patrol itself began with the boat's departure from Kristiansand on 15 May 1944.

On 3 June she was attacked and sunk by depth charges dropped from a Canadian Canso flying boat of No. 162 Squadron RCAF west of Trondheim.

Fifty-one men went down with U-477; there were no survivors.

References

Bibliography

External links

German Type VIIC submarines
U-boats commissioned in 1943
U-boats sunk in 1944
U-boats sunk by depth charges
1943 ships
Ships built in Kiel
World War II submarines of Germany
Ships lost with all hands
World War II shipwrecks in the Norwegian Sea
U-boats sunk by Canadian aircraft
Maritime incidents in June 1944